Southfields is a district of London, England.

Southfields can also refer to:

Southfields, Essex, England
Southfields, Leicester, Leicestershire, England
Southfields, New York, United States

See also 
 Southfield (disambiguation)